Henry Ice Rise is a triangular-shaped ice rise about  long located between Korff Ice Rise and the southern portion of Berkner Island in the Ronne Ice Shelf, Antarctica. Henry died aboard his ship, February 16, 1975, while returning from his fourteenth voyage to Antarctica in support of the U.S. Antarctic Research Program.

References

Filchner-Ronne Ice Shelf
Ice rises of Queen Elizabeth Land